A Vassa candle, or Tean Vassa, is a giant beeswax candle which burns for the whole duration of the Theravada Buddhist festival of Vassa used especially in Cambodia and Thailand. It has been compared to the paschal candle of Christians, which burns during the whole season of Paschaltide.

History

Angkorian origin: the deflowering of girls 
An ancient Angkorian rite was associated with the presence of a large candle, sometimes compared to the Vassa candle. According to the Chinese diplomat Zhou Daguan who visited Angkor in the 12th century, the rite the tchen-t'an was a rite of "deflowering" of young girls. Girls between seven and nine years were submitted to that rite.

A Buddhist rite since the 19th century 

The first archeological reference to a Vassa candle holder is found in the early 19th century in Siem Reap. The oldest Buddhist Vassa candle dates back to 1807–1857. The second oldest reference to Vassa candle is based on the Cambodian Royal Chronicles composed during the reign of King Ang Duong. The genealogy mentions that no Vassa candle had been found beforehand. Vassa candle tradition therefore emerged as one of the "candle-lit ceremonies" led by Buddhist monks.

Wax Candle Festivals in the 21st century 

In the pre-electricity era, one of the offerings people would make was candles which monks could use to help light the temple during the darker days of the rainy season. Candle-giving has morphed into one of Thailand's more colourful festivals. This carving has become so intricate that some observers even consider it to be "extravagant". In various localities of Thailand, this has evolved into Wax Candle Festivals with teams coming "from all over the world to compete and the detail on the wax artworks is staggering, with some being colossal in scale."

Rituality

Moulding 
In Cambodia, an annual ceremony known as sett tean Vassa is hold at the royal palace for the Vassa candle moulding. The Khmer monarch, sitting on a throne, pours the melted wax, into moulds held by the purohit baku attached to the religious service of the palace.

Offering 
Offering a Vassa candle is a particular honor sought after by government officials and benefactors of Buddhist pagodas in Cambodia.

The Vassa candle is usually carried by men and brought to the pagoda in an elaborate procession.

Lighting 
While monks have historically been the ones tasked with lighting the Vassa candle, laypeople have more recently also been granted that privilege.

Formerly, the candle could be lit only with fire coming from a stone beaten by a lighter or by fire obtained by the friction of two bamboo sticks. Today, a simple match is enough.

Once lit, the candle has to burn for the full length of the Vassa festival.

Fabrication 
A Vassa candle is traditionally prepared by the achar from twelve kilograms of natural beeswax. It measures 93 centimeters and is seated on a pedestal or throne called balan, about 29 centimeters high.

In modern day, beeswax is usually recycled by melting old candles stumps, collected from within the temple, or donated by the surrounding villages. Hairdryers are used to re-soften the wax, allowing them to mould and create the shapes. Sculptors create the more intricate carvings and details of the exterior.

On top of the large candle is placed an actual candle to be lit. The wax candle is carved with intricate design of lotus flowers. It is often be crowned with a small recipient filled with coconut oil which burns instead of the wax.

Symbolism 
Vassa candles are considered to be "the light for life", through which the dark part of life would be lightened, guiding a way out toward nirvana.

References 

Candles
Buddhism in Cambodia
Buddhism in Thailand
Khmer folklore